Stenostola basisuturalis is a species of beetle in the family Cerambycidae. It was described by Gressitt in 1935. It is known from China.

References

Saperdini
Beetles described in 1935